João Emanuel Carneiro Silva (born 17 February 1970), also known by his initials JEC, is a screenwriter, film director, and author of Brazilian telenovelas. His many works include: Central Station, Midnight, Orfeu, and Castelo Rá-Tim-Bum. 

His greatest hit on television was Avenida Brasil that broke several TV audience records in Brazil and abroad, being sold to more than 130 countries. Aired originally between March-October 2012, the telenovela achieved an overall average of 42 rating points and a 69% share. The last episode scored an impressive 56 rating points and an 84% share, with more than 50 million (sic) viewers, becoming the most watched TV program of the year. Avenida Brasil, was considered by Forbes the most-commercially successful telenovela in Brazilian history, with total earnings estimated in $1 billion. 

He was considered by Época, one of the 100 most influential Brazilians in 2012.

Biography
Carneiro began his writing career and director in 1991 with the Zero Zero movie, but achieved international popularity to sign the award-winning film script by Walter Salles, Central Station, starring by Fernanda Montenegro.

On television, he collaborated with Maria Adelaide Amaral in the script of the miniseries A Muralha (2000), Os Maias (2001) and in the telenovela Desejos de Mulher (2002). His first work as lead author was in Da Cor do Pecado (2004), which was a great success on Brazilian television. In 2006, wrote Cobras & Lagartos. In 2008, he wrote the telenovela A Favorita, his first in primetime.

Avenida Brasil written by him in 2012, became the most exported telenovela of Rede Globo, surpassing Da Cor do Pecado, which was the sales leader for other countries so far. The telenovela has been licensed for 150 countries over the past 20 months and dubbed into 19 languages as English, Spanish, Arabic, Greek, Polish, Russian and French. Besides Europe and Latin America, Avenue Brazil has been licensed to more than 58 countries in Africa and Middle East countries as well. 

João Emanuel Carneiro is half brother of actress Claudia Ohana and son of writer, anthropologist and art critic Lelia Coelho Frota.

Career
Television 

Films

Awards

References

External links 

 João Emanuel Carneiro at the Memória Globo

Brazilian male screenwriters
1970 births
Living people
Authors of Brazilian telenovelas
Brazilian male writers
Male television writers
Brazilian LGBT screenwriters